Ah Toy (18 May 1829 – 1 February 1928) was a Chinese American prostitute and madam in San Francisco, California during the California Gold Rush, and the first Chinese prostitute in San Francisco. Arriving from Hong Kong in 1848, she became the best-known Asian woman in the American frontier. 

When Ah Toy left China for the United States, she originally traveled with her husband, who died during the travel. Ah Toy became the mistress of the ship's captain, who gave her so much gold that by the time she arrived in San Francisco, Ah Toy had a good amount of money. Before 1851 there were only seven Chinese women known to be in the city, and noticing the looks she drew from the men in her new town, she figured they would pay for a closer look. Her peep shows became successful, and she was known to charge an ounce of gold (sixteen dollars) for a "lookee". Afterwards, she became the most famous Chinese prostitute, and one of the highest paid and most famous in San Francisco. Due to her romantic relationship with the brothel inspector James A. Clarke, Ah Toy's brothel escaped shut-down by San Francisco authorities during a Committee of Vigilance investigation.

Ah Toy was described as a determined and intelligent woman; she frequently used the San Francisco Recorder's Court to protect herself and her business from exploitation. Ah Toy proceeded to open a chain of new brothels in 1852 and 1853, importing girls from China in their teens, 20s and 30s to work in them - some were as young as eleven. Ah Toy also faced pressure from male Chinese leaders, specifically Yuen Sheng, also known as Norman As-sing, who did not like the idea of a woman leading the brothel industry in the city. By 1854 however, Ah Toy was no longer able to take her grievances to court. In the case People v. Hall, the California Supreme Court reversed the conviction of George Hall, who had murdered a Chinese man, extending a California law that African Americans and Native Americans could not testify in court to include the Chinese. While this law was not directed at prostitutes, it handicapped Ah Toy's ability to protect herself from the domineering Chinese tongs that had for long sought to control her and her business. Coupled with the anti-prostitution law of 1854, which was carried out mainly against the Chinese, the pressure to stay in business became too great, and Ah Toy withdrew from San Francisco's prostitution business in 1857, announcing her departure to journalists.

In 1857, she returned to China as a wealthy woman, intending to live the rest of her days in comfort, but she returned to California by 1859. From 1868 until her death in 1928, she lived a mostly quiet life in Santa Clara County, often living with her numerous different partners over the decades, many of whom she was unable to marry because of anti-miscegenation laws in California which at the time prevented people of East Asian descent from marrying white people. Ah Toy returned to mainstream public attention upon dying in San Jose on 1 February 1928, aged 98, about three months before her ninety-ninth birthday.

In popular culture 

Olivia Cheng portrays Ah Toy in Cinemax's Warrior, set during the Tong Wars in late 19th century San Francisco. The series begins in the late 1870s.

References

External links
Ah Toy mention at PBS 

1829 births
1928 deaths
American brothel owners and madams
American prostitutes
Cantonese people
Chinese emigrants to the United States
Chinese female prostitutes
History of San Francisco
LGBT people from California
Chinese LGBT people
People_of_the_California_Gold_Rush
People of the American Old West
Human trafficking in the United States
American female organized crime figures
19th-century American businesspeople
19th-century American businesswomen
19th-century Chinese businesspeople
19th-century Chinese businesswomen
People from Chinatown, San Francisco
American slave traders